Alirio Palacios (December 7, 1938 – September 11, 2015) was a Venezuelan visual artist known for his drawings, graphic designing, printmaking and sculpture. Horse figures were often motifs of his graphic art and sculpture, an obsession he developed during his long stay in China.  Among other awards, Palacios won the National Prize of Plastic Arts of Venezuela in 1977. His work is on display in museums and public sites internationally, including the presidential Palace and the National Supreme Court in Caracas, the Casa de Las Américas in Havana, and the University of Edinburgh where Palacio's portrait of the first Venezuelan President Jose Maria Vargas is on permanent display.

Education and career
He was born near Tucupita, Delta Amacuro. As a child, Palacios began painting in his hometown by the Orinoco River, depicting animal figures with chalk on blackboards from his mother's and aunt's school. At sixteen, he began studies at the Caracas School of Fine Arts (Venezuela), where he graduated in 1960. Palacios traveled to Europe representing his home country at the VII Youth Festival in Vienna, Austria (1960). He undertook further painting studies at the Academy of Fine Arts, Rome, Italy (1961) and also studied water base engraving techniques at the University of Fine Arts in Beijing, China, where he was tutored by Li Hua and Li Co Yan, graduating in 1969. He was later an Intern at the Academy of Art in Berlin, Germany (1968–1970), and studied Printmaking at the University of Warsaw, Poland. From 1985 he resided in New York for 20 years, during which he pursued his art career and also acted as a cultural adviser to the Venezuelan Consulate. He then moved back to his home country, where he was widely revered. He authored many books on his own work, and illustrated several literature books by other authors.

He acknowledged Piero della Francesca, the Italian Renaissance Master, as an influence on his work.

Palacios died in Caracas of heart failure in 2015.

Awards

 1957 Graphic Art Prize, Poster section, Escuela de Artes Plásticas y Applicadas, Caracas
 1959 Second Prize for Drawing, First National Exhibition of Drawaing and Engraving, Faculty of Architecture and Urbanism, Central University of Venezuela, UCV
1960 Third Prize, I Salón de las Artes Applicadas, Casa de la Cultura, Maracay, Venezuela
 1961
 Prize Henrique Otero Vizcarrondo, XXII Salón Arturo Michelena, Valencia, Venezuela
 Roma Prize, XXII Salón Arturo Michelena
 Prize Arturo Michelena (shared with Armando Pérez), XIX Salón Arturo Michelena, Valencia, Venezuela
 1964 Second Prize, III Salón Aragua, Casa de la Cultura, Maracay, Venezuela
 1966 Roma Prize, XXVII Salón Oficial / Gold Medal, Graphic Art Biennial, Barranquilla, Colombia
 1967
 Roma Prize, XXVIII Salón Oficial Arturo Michelena, Valencia, Venezuela
 First Prize, V Salón Aragua, Casa de la Cultura, Maracay, Venezuela
 First Prize, IX Salón Nacional de Dibujo y Grabado, Facultad de Arquitectura y Urbanismo, UCV
 1968
 Prize Fundación Mendoza, X Salón Nacional de Dibujo y Grabado, Facultad de Arquitectura y Urbanismo, UCV
 Prize Emil Friedman, XXIX Salón Arturo Michelena, Valencia, Venezuela
 1971
Gold Medal, First Graphic Art Biennial de Cali, Colombia
 Acquisition Prize, I Salón Nacional de Jóvenes Artistas, Casa de la Cultura, Maracay
 Gold Medal, III International Graphic Art Biennial, Florencia, Italia
 1976 Job Fellowship, Salón Las Artes Plásticas en Venezuela, Fine Art Museum (MBA)
 1977 Venezuelan National Prize for Fine Arts, Caracas
 1980 First Prize, II Salón del Dibujo Actual en Venezuela, Fundarte
 1981
 Acquisition Prize, I Biennial of Visual Arts, Fine Art Museum, Caracas
 Prize Andrés Pérez Mujica, XXXIX Salón Arturo Michelena, Valencia, Venezuela
 1984
 International Prize Flavio de Carvalho, I Biennial, Havana, Cuba
 Prize Ciudad de La Habana, I Biennial, Havana, Cuba

Permanent collections

 Museum of Arts, Carabobo State, Venezuela
 Casa de las Américas, Havana, Cuba
 Centro de Estudios Latinoamericanos, CELARG, Caracas
 Contemporary Art Museum, Caracas
 National Art Gallery, Caracas, Venezuela
 Highway Museum for Peace , binational highway connecting Cúcuta, in northeast Colombia, to San Antonio del Táchira, in southwest Venezuela

 Miraflores Palace , Jose Maria Vargas Portrait
 Venezuelan Central Bank, Caracas

A wider list of collections reported to show works by Alirio Palacios includes: Galería Municipal de Arte, Puerto La Cruz, Central University of Venezuela , Beijing University School of Arts, Academy of Fine Arts in Warsaw, National Museum, Warsaw , Brooklyn Museum , Association of Plastic Arts in Shanghai , Centre Genevois de Gravure Contemporaine and Musée d’Art et d’Histoire (Geneva).

Art market
Many of Palacios's works have been successfully sold at auctions by Sotheby's and Christie's in New York City, Hotel des Ventes in Geneve, and Odalys in Caracas. The artist is listed in important reference sources such as The Encyclopedia of Latin American and Caribbean Art.

Bibliography

195? - Palacios A & Rabinowicz A : Miscellaneous Ephemeral Material

1957 - Subero E, Palacios A, Palacios L: Isla de Luz sobre el amor anclada: poemas

1967 - Palacios L & Palacios A: Tarde a temprano, poemas

1968 - Urdaneta J: Momentos Hostiles: Diseño Gráfico

1979 - Palacios A: Fábulas

1984 - Palacios A: Manchas de Asombro
Author:	Alirio Palacios

1986 - Palacios A: New Works on Paper

1986 - Arraiz A & Palacios A: Memorias del Latifundio

1988 - Palacios A: Recent Work on Paper

1988 - Palacios A, Apparitions

1993 - Entre lo Real y sus Signos

1999 - Palacios A: Xilografías y Concretografías

References

External links
Alirio Palacios official website
Alirio Palacios Video: Olivos

1938 births
2015 deaths
Contemporary painters
Venezuelan painters
Venezuelan artists
People from Tucupita